Reflections is the first solo album by singer Candice Night of Blackmore's Night, released in 2011. In comparison with their previous releases, the album contains more modern sounds, and consists of mostly soft rock ballads. It featured the single "Call It Love" (USA), or the radio single "Gone Gone Gone" (Europe). She made a video-clip of the song Black Roses.

Track listing
All songs written by Candice Night

 "Wind Is Calling (Hush the Wind)" – 4:39 
 "Gone Gone Gone" – 3:28    
 "Black Roses" – 3:31    
 "Now and Then (2011)" – 5:11 (re-recorded new version)
 "Dangerous Smile" – 4:09   
 "For You" – 3:32    
 "Call It Love" – 4:41 (re-recorded new version)
 "Robin Red Breast" – 4:13
 "Alone with Fate" – 3:33 (re-recorded new version)
 "In Time" – 1:50 (Instrumental)

Credits 
 Executive Producer – Candice Night
 Producer – Pat Regan
 Violin – Elizabeth Cary
 Layout & Cover Design: Hiko
 Photography – Keith Major, Michael Keel
 Management: Carole Stevens
 Publishing company: Haunted Song

References

External links
Reflections at Allmusic
 (official promotional video)
 (official promotional video)

2011 debut albums
Pop rock albums by American artists